Chợ Lớn may refer to several locations in South Vietnam:

 Chợ Lớn, Ho Chi Minh City
 Chợ Lớn Province